Irwin is an Irish, Scottish, and English surname stemming from the surname Eoforwine, a combination of the Old English words for boar and friend. Notable people with the surname include:

 Alexander Irwin (died 1752), British Army officer
 Alexander J. Irwin (1799–1843), United States territorial legislator
 Andy Offutt Irwin, American storyteller and singer/songwriter
 Arthur Irwin (1858–1921), Canadian-American shortstop and manager in Major League Baseball
 Ashton Irwin (born 1994), Australian drummer in the band 5 Seconds of Summer
 Bill Irwin (wrestler), professional wrestler
 Bill Irwin (born 1950), American actor and clown
 Charles Irwin (1824–1873), Irish recipient of the Victoria Cross
 Clint Irwin (born 1989), American soccer goalkeeper
 Denis Irwin (born 1965), Irish footballer
 Dennis Irwin (1951–2008), American jazz musician 
 Elaine Irwin, American supermodel and spokeswoman for Almay Cosmetics
 Francis Xavier Irwin (1934–2019), American Roman Catholic bishop
 Frederick Irwin (1788–1860), acting Governor of Western Australia
 George Rankine Irwin (1907–1998), American scientist specializing in fracture mechanics
 Hale Irwin (born 1945), American golfer
 Heath Irwin (born 1973), American football player (nephew of Hale)
 Herbert Carmichael Irwin (1894–1930), Irish-born aviator and athlete
 Inez Haynes Irwin (1873–1970), American feminist author
 J. David Irwin, electrical engineering educator
 James Irwin (disambiguation), several people
 James Bruce Irwin (1921–2012), New Zealand botanist
 Sir James Murray Irwin (1858–1938), British Army doctor who served in Sudan, the Boer War and the Great War
 Jared Irwin (1750–1818), Governor of Georgia
 Jeff Irwin, American musician
 Jennifer Irwin (born 1975), Canadian actress
 John N. Irwin (1844–1905), American politician and Governor of Idaho Territory (1883) and Arizona Territory (1890–1892)
 John Rice Irwin (1930–2022), American cultural historian
 John N. Irwin, II (1913–2000), American diplomat
 Julia Irwin, Australian politician
 Julienne Irwin, American singer
 Kenny Irwin Jr. (1969–2000), American racing driver
 Les Irwin (1898–1985), Australian politician
 Lew Irwin, radio broadcaster and founder of The Credibility Gap
 Malcolm Robert Irwin (1897–1987), American immunogeneticist
 Matt Irwin (born 1987), Canadian ice hockey player
 May Irwin (1862–1938), actress, singer and major star of vaudeville
 Michael Irwin (disambiguation), several people
 Noel Irwin (1892–1972), British World War II general
 Pat Irwin, (born 1955) American composer and musician
 Pat Irwin, (1921–1999), Oklahoma judge
 Patrick H. Irwin (1837–1908), American civil engineer and surveyor
 Robert Irwin (disambiguation), several people
 Ron Irwin (1936–2020), Canadian politician
 Scott Irwin, professional wrestler and brother of Bill Irwin
 Steve Irwin (1962–2006), Australian conservationist and television personality
 Bob Irwin (born 1939), Steve's father, Australian naturalist
 Terri Irwin (born 1964), Steve's widow, American-born naturalist
 Bindi Irwin (born 1998), Steve and Terri's daughter, Australian television personality
 Robert Irwin (television personality) (born 2003), Steve and Terri's son, Australian television personality
 Steve Irwin, Australian rugby league footballer
 Stu Irwin (1903–1967), American actor
 Trenton Irwin (born 1995), American football player
 William Irwin (disambiguation), various people named William or Bill Irwin
 E. F. L. Wood, 1st Earl of Halifax, created Baron Irwin in 1926

See also
 Baron Irwin
 Earvin
 Ervin (disambiguation)
 Ervine
 Erving (disambiguation)
 Erwan
 Erwin (disambiguation)
 Irmin (disambiguation)
 Irvin
 Irvine (disambiguation)
 Irving (disambiguation)
 Irwin (disambiguation)
 Irwin (given name)

References

English-language surnames
Surnames of English origin
Surnames of Scottish origin
Anglicised Irish-language surnames